Nettleham is a large village and civil parish within the West Lindsey district of Lincolnshire, England,  north-east from the city of Lincoln between the A46 and A158.

The population of the civil parish was 3,437 at the 2011 census.

History
The now-demolished Bishop's Manor House at Nettleham was the property of Edith of Wessex, wife of Edward the Confessor and later Empress Matilda, daughter of King Henry I, before passing into the possession of the Bishops of Lincoln, who enlarged it to create a Bishop's Palace appropriate to one of the country's most important Sees. On 7 February 1301 King Edward I was staying in the Bishop's Palace when he created his son Edward (later King Edward II) as the first Prince of Wales. The building was damaged during the Lincolnshire Rising of 1536 and completely demolished by 1650, only traces of foundations remaining on the site now called Bishop's Palace Field.

The parish church of All Saints dates from the Saxon period, with medieval and 19th century additions. It is now in the benefice of Nettleham with Riseholme and Grange de Lings.

Within the church's graveyard is a headstone in memory of Thomas Gardiner, a post-boy murdered hereabouts by two highway robbers in January 1733. The inscription declares he was 'barbarously murdered' aged 19. The robbers - two brothers by the name of Hallam - committed another murder near Faldingworth before being arrested. They were convicted of murder at Lincoln and executed at the site of their crimes. (Thomas Gardiner's headstone declares he was killed on 3 January 1732 since at the time Britain used the Julian Calendar.)

The Royal Society for Nature Conservation (RSNC) had been based in Nettleham but moved to Newark-on-Trent in 1999. The site became the home of the WATCH Trust for Environmental Conservation, but this also moved to Newark a few years ago.

Governance
Since April 1974 Nettleham has formed part of the West Lindsey district of Lincolnshire. It forms part of the Gainsborough parliamentary constituency which is represented by Sir Edward Leigh.

Geography
The parish boundary meets Greetwell on the A158 Horncastle/Wragby road. It follows the A15 Wragby Road into Lincoln for about  where it meets Lincoln, and skirts the edge of the housing estate (Glebe Park) next to the bypass; the Lincoln bypass (A158) from the A46 to the A158 is in the parish. The bypass passes northwards skirting, the edge of the University of Lincoln's Riseholme College. 550 yards north of Nettleham Hall, it meets Grange de Lings, and borders this parish along a farm track until the A46, where it meets Scothern just north of  Nettleham Heath Farm. It crosses Scothern Beck north of Skelton House Farm, passes south, and at Nettleham Beck it meets Sudbrooke, crossing Sudbrooke Lane east of Richmond Farm. North of Manor Farm, it meets Reepham on the A158 Roman road and follows the A158 to North Greetwell, where it meets Greetwell.

Community
Nettleham has won the "Best Kept Village Award" several times, and the centre of the village is a conservation area. Large modern housing estates surround the old village centre. Nettleham is also the location of the Lincolnshire Police headquarters to the west of the village near the A46. It was opened by the Queen in 1980.

Village public houses are the Black Horse on Chapel Lane, the Plough on Church Street, and the White Hart on High Street.

The parish includes an oil well owned by Star Energy, north of the A158 bypass, which has been producing since 1985.

Sport
Nettleham F.C. have been members of the Lincolnshire League since their relegation from the Central Midlands League. They have twice played Aston Villa football club in friendlies. Nettleham Cricket Club play in the Lincolnshire ECB League.  Both teams play their home fixtures at Mulsanne Park, Nettleham. The village also has a tennis club and has been the new home of Lincoln Rugby Football Club since 2014.

Twinning
  Mulsanne, Pays de la Loire, north-west France. The sports pitch is called Mulsanne Park.

Notable people
Grace Mary Crowfoot née Hood, a pioneer in the study of archaeological textiles. Daughter of Sinclair Frankland Hood of Nettleham Hall.
Henry Holbeach – served as the last Prior and first Dean of Worcester; buried here
 Allison Pearson, Telegraph columnist, grew up on Washdyke Lane, in the 1970s

References

External links

Village website

Villages in Lincolnshire
Civil parishes in Lincolnshire
West Lindsey District